The 1990 New Mexico State Aggies football team represented New Mexico State University in the 1990 NCAA Division I-A football season as a member of the Big West Conference. The Aggies were coached by head coach Jim Hess and played their home games at Aggie Memorial Stadium in Las Cruces, New Mexico.

Schedule

References

New Mexico State
New Mexico State Aggies football seasons
Aggies football